The Amateurliga Südwest was the highest football league in the region of the Südwest FA and the third tier of the German football league system from its inception in 1952 to the formation of the Oberliga Südwest and the Verbandsliga Südwest below it in 1978.

Overview
The Amateurliga Südwest was formed in 1952 in the southern half of the state of Rheinland-Pfalz. Before its inception, three separate leagues operated in the area as the highest level of play. The league was a feeder league to the 2. Oberliga Südwest. From 1952 until the establishment of the Oberliga Südwest in 1978, it was the third tier of the football league system.

The winner of the Amateurliga Südwest was not automatically promoted to its superior league but rather had to take part in a promotion play-off. The champion would have to compete with the winners of the Amateurligas Saarland and Rheinland.

Until 1933, the region covered by the Südwest FA was politically part of two other German states. The south, the Pfalz region, was part of Bavaria and the north, the Rheinhessen region, was part of Hessen. After the war, these regions were incorporated into the new state of Rheinland-Pfalz. The separation of these areas from their original states results from the outcome of World War II when they became part of the French occupation zone, while Hessen and Bavaria where in the US zone.

The league was established in 1952 with sixteen teams, the winner gaining promotion to the 2. Oberliga Südwest. The founder members were:

BSC Oppau
VfR Friesenheim
FSV Schifferstadt
Phönix Bellheim
SV Alsenborn
TuS Hochspeyer
SpVgg Idar
Palatia Böhl
SC Oberstein 08
SC West-Kaiserslautern
SpVgg Ingelheim
SV Gonsenheim
Fontania Finthen
FC Sobernheim
SG Waldfischbach
SV Mundenheim

With the introduction of the Bundesliga in 1963 the Amateurliga was placed below the new Regionalliga Südwest but still retained its third-tier status. It continued to do so after the introduction of the 2. Bundesliga Süd in 1974.

The 1. FC Kaiserslautern II holds the record for years in the league, having spent 21 continuous seasons in it from 1957 to 1978.

There is room for some confusion with the existence of the Oberliga Südwest as well as the Verbandsliga Südwest and the now defunct leagues Regionalliga Südwest and Amateurliga Südwest. While the Oberliga and Regionalliga of that name cover and covered the whole states of Rheinland-Pfalz and Saarland, the Verbandsliga and Amateurliga only covered the southern part of Rheinland-Pfalz and operated as feeders for the first two. The root of the problem lies in the lack of common history in the region and therefore the lack of a common name.

Disbanding of the Amateurliga Südwest
In 1978, the Oberliga Südwest was formed to allow direct promotion to the 2. Bundesliga Süd for the Amateure champion of the area. The teams placed one to five gained entry to the Oberliga while the next eleven teams were put into the new Verbandsliga Südwest, now the fourth tier of the football league system. The bottom four teams were relegated to the Bezirksliga.

Admitted to the new Oberliga:

FSV Mainz 05
Hassia Bingen
Eintracht Kreuznach
Südwest Ludwigshafen
1. FC Kaiserslautern II

Relegated to the new Verbandsliga:

FK Clausen
VfR Kirn
Ludwigshafener SC
FC Rodalben
Viktoria Herxheim
SG Pirmasens
TuS Landstuhl
VfR Frankenthal
Gummi-Mayer Landau
1. FC Haßloch
VfR Baumholder

Relegated to the Bezirksliga:

ASV Idar-Oberstein
SV Guntersblum
SV Worms-Horchheim
FC Sobernheim

Winners of the Amateurliga Südwest 

Source:

 Bold denotes team gained promotion.
 In 1960 the FSV Schifferstadt was promoted as runners–up since Kaiserslautern's reserve team was ineligible for promotion. For the same reason, FV Speyer was promoted in 1968.

References

Sources
 Deutschlands Fußball in Zahlen,  An annual publication with tables and results from the Bundesliga to Verbandsliga/Landesliga, publisher: DSFS
 kicker Almanach,  The yearbook on German football from Bundesliga to Oberliga, since 1937, published by the kicker Sports Magazine
 Süddeutschlands Fussballgeschichte in Tabellenform 1897–1988  History of Southern German football in tables, publisher & author: Ludolf Hyll
 Die Deutsche Liga-Chronik 1945–2005  History of German football from 1945 to 2005 in tables, publisher: DSFS, published: 2006

External links 
 Das deutsche Fussball Archiv  Historic German league tables
 Verbandsliga Südwest at Fussball.de

1978 disestablishments in Germany
Defunct association football leagues in Germany
Football competitions in Rhineland-Palatinate
1952 establishments in West Germany
Sports leagues established in 1952
Ger